Fernand Dumont  (24 June 1927 – 1 May 1997) was a Canadian sociologist, philosopher, theologian, and poet from Quebec. A longtime professor at Université Laval, he won the Governor General's Award for French-language non-fiction at the 1968 Governor General's Awards for Le lieu de l'homme.

See also
 Quebec literature

References

External links
 

1927 births
1997 deaths
20th-century Canadian male writers
20th-century Canadian poets
20th-century Canadian philosophers
20th-century Roman Catholic theologians
Canadian male poets
Canadian philosophers
Canadian poets in French
Canadian Roman Catholic theologians
Canadian sociologists
Governor General's Award-winning non-fiction writers
Prix Athanase-David winners
Catholic philosophers
Academic staff of Université Laval
Writers from Quebec City
Université Laval alumni